St Matthew's RC High School is a mixed Roman Catholic secondary school located in the Moston area of Manchester, England. The school is named after Saint Matthew, one of the twelve apostles of Jesus and, according to Christian tradition, one of the four Evangelists.

The school building was rebuilt during 2007-2009 and opened in September 2009. This was to replace the aging building built in the 1970s. The school celebrated 40 years open in September 2017. In January 2018 for the first time in its history, the school was placed into special measures by Ofsted, following the November 2017 inspection. This happened as a result of low pass rates in English and maths (in which the school ranked in the bottom 10% nationally), poor leadership, as well as noticeable behavioural and attendance issues. The school previously ranked as requires improvement in September 2015, and Good in 2012. In September 2018, Helen Murden took over as Headteacher.

Previously a voluntary aided school administered by Manchester City Council, in June 2021 St Matthew's RC High School converted to academy status. The school is now sponsored by the Emmaus Catholic Academy Trust. It continues to be a Catholic school under the jurisdiction of the Roman Catholic Diocese of Salford.

St Matthew's RC High School offers GCSEs, BTECs and Cambridge Nationals as programmes of study for pupils.

Notable former pupils
 Aitch (rapper)
 Brandon Barker, footballer 
 Anthony Crolla, boxer
 Terry Flanagan (boxer)
 Jonathan Macken, footballer

References

External links
St Matthew's RC High School

Secondary schools in Manchester
Catholic secondary schools in the Diocese of Salford
Academies in Manchester
Educational institutions established in 1977
1977 establishments in England